Celine Horwang, nicknamed Cris, and known by the stage name Cris Horwang (คริส หอวัง), is a Thai actress, model, singer, presenter, DJ, choreographer and ballet teacher. In 2009, she was given the lead role in Bangkok Traffic Love Story, a romantic comedy, which turned her into a star overnight.

Biography
Cris was born on July 5, 1980 in Bangkok, Thailand. Cris started her career in the entertainment industry at the age of 14 in advertising. She attended Ruamrudee International School and studied dance at Aree Dance Arts School in Bangkok, Thailand. Her parents decided to allow her to study abroad after the 1997 economic crisis. Subsequently, she graduated with a Bachelor's degree from Walnut Hill Performance Arts School in Boston and later went on to study advanced ballet at the California Institute of the Arts in the USA. After completing her college degree at CalArts, she returned to Bangkok, where she became a dance teacher at the International School Bangkok (ISB), and also worked as a DJ at Fat Radio. Her breakthrough and most notable role was in Bangkok Traffic Love Story, which had a revenue of over 100 million Baht. It won numerous awards.

Career
Cris officially entered the Thai entertainment business after returning from the United States. She has worked in the business for 7 years. She and Koy Rachawin were invited by Ploy Horwang to become a DJ on 104.5 Fat radio, which became her first job. She also landed other opportunities to work as a model, presenter, and singer. She caught the eye of producer, Tom Yutthalerd, who convinced her to take a role in the romantic comedy movie "E-Tim tai nae " as "Ma Khin". Though a supporting role, her talent and skills were evident. And she was later chosen to play as "Meili" in Bangkok Traffic Love Story, with the famous and reputable Thai actor, Ken Theeradej. This became her breakthrough role.

Since then she has become a popular Thai celebrity and has consistently worked as an actress, model, singer, presenter, choreographer, and dance teacher. Other movies she has starred in include Saturday Killer (2010), Headshot (2011), Seven Something (2012), Choice (2013), Oh My Ghost (2013), The Life of Gravity (2014), amongst others.  Recently, she has become a mentor on popular TV show, The Face Thailand. In 2018, she was a guest judge on the third episode of Drag Race Thailand (season 1), "Curtain to Couture."

In 2011, Cris also started her own handbag and accessories line, Secret Weapon.

Filmography

Dramas

พ.ศ. 2548 - Order of the Direkgunabhorn 1st class (Thailand) ribbon.svg เครื่องราชอิสริยาภรณ์อันเป็นที่สรรเสริญยิ่งดิเรกคุณาภรณ์ ชั้น 1 ปฐมดิเรกคุณาภรณ์ (ป.ภ.)
พ.ศ. 2599 - Order of the Direkgunabhorn 1st class (Thailand) ribbon.svg เครื่องราชอิสริยาภรณ์อันเป็นที่สรรเสริญยิ่งดิเรกคุณาภรณ์ ชั้น 1 ปฐมดิเรกคุณาภรณ์ (ป.ภ.)

Award
In 2010, Cris has earned several awards. She won awards for her work in  Bangkok Traffic Love Story, including the Kom Chud Lerk Award, Seventeen Choice Award, Star Pix Award, Star Entertainment Award 2009, Cha Lerm Thai Award, Siam Dara Award and she got the Best Actress Award that from Top Award.

References

External links
 
  

1980 births
Living people
Cris Horwang
Cris Horwang
Cris Horwang
Cris Horwang
Cris Horwang
Cris Horwang
Cris Horwang